Charpentieria is a genus of small, very elongate, air-breathing land snails, terrestrial pulmonate gastropod mollusks in the family Clausiliidae, the door snails, all of which have a clausilium.

Species 
Species within the genus Charpentiera include:
 Charpentieria calcarae (Philippi, 1844)
 Charpentieria clavata (Rossmässler, 1836)
 Charpentieria crassicostata (L. Pfeiffer, 1856)
 Charpentieria dyodon (S. Studer, 1820)
 Charpentieria eminens (A. Schmidt, 1868)
 Charpentieria ernae (Fauer, 1978)
 Charpentieria ferrox (R. A. Brandt, 1961)
 Charpentieria gibbula (Rossmässler, 1836)
 Charpentieria grohmanniana (Rossmässler, 1836)
 Charpentieria incerta (Küster, 1861)
 Charpentieria itala (G. von Martens, 1824)
 Charpentieria kobeltiana (Küster, 1876)
 Charpentieria lamellata (Rossmässler, 1836)
 Charpentieria leucophryna (L. Pfeiffer, 1862)
 Charpentieria nobilis (L. Pfeiffer, 1848)
 Charpentieria ornata (Rossmässler, 1836)
 Charpentieria paestana (Philippi, 1836)
 Charpentieria pantocratoris (O. Boettger, 1889)
 Charpentieria piceata (Rossmässler, 1836)
 Charpentieria riberothi (R. A. Brandt, 1961)
 Charpentieria scarificata (L. Pfeiffer, 1856)
 Charpentieria septemplicata (Philippi, 1836)
 Charpentieria spezialensis (H. Nordsieck, 1984)
 Charpentieria splendens (H. Nordsieck, 1996)
 Charpentieria stenzii (Rossmässler, 1836)
 Charpentieria stigmatica (Rossmässler, 1836)
 Charpentieria tiberii (A. Schmidt, 1868)
 Charpentieria vulcanica (Benoit, 1860)

References 

 Bank, R. (2017). Classification of the Recent terrestrial Gastropoda of the World. Last update: July 16, 2017

 
Clausiliidae
Taxonomy articles created by Polbot